Epinotia cruciana, the willow tortrix, is a moth of the family Tortricidae.

Description
The wingspan is 12–15 mm. This moth has a characteristic wing pattern, with a pale brown ground colour and dark brown markings of the forewings, resembling a cross (hence the Latin name cruciana of the species).

Adults are on wing from June to early August.

The larvae feed on various sallows and willows, mainly Salix repens, on which the larva spins together the leaves of a terminal shoot and feeds within.

Distribution
This species can be found from Europe to Japan and in North America.

References

External links
Images of Epinotia cruciana at Moth Photographers Group

Moths described in 1761
Taxa named by Carl Linnaeus
Eucosmini
Moths of Japan
Moths of Europe
Insects of Turkey